Leslie John McCann (29 August 1920 – 13 February 1994) was an Australian rules footballer who played with Carlton in the Victorian Football League (VFL).

Notes

External links 

Les McCann's profile at Blueseum

1920 births
1994 deaths
Carlton Football Club players
Australian rules footballers from Victoria (Australia)